Christian Latin literature has a long history with its foundations being laid during the 4th and 5th centuries. They included the church fathers Augustine of Hippo, Jerome, and Ambrose, and the first great Christian poet, Prudentius.

History
The earliest language of the Christian Church was koine Greek, which was the language of the Eastern Roman empire in the 1st century AD.  However, as Christianity spread through other parts of the Roman empire where Latin was used, a growing body of Latin literature was produced. Until the end of the 3rd century, the main genre was apologetics (justifications of Christianity), by writers such as Minucius Felix, Tertullian, Arnobius, and Lactantius.  St Jerome translated the Bible into Latin in the 4th century, producing an edition known as the Vulgate.  This led to the increased use of Latin by the Church Fathers of the 4th century, including Ambrose, and St Augustine of Hippo.  Much of what they wrote was concerned with the theological controversies of the time, such as Arianism.

In the Middle Ages, Latin was still the main language for literature in Western Europe.  Plays written in Latin were often part of medieval Easter celebrations, and there were other forms of drama in Latin. Latin was also used for religious lyric poetry and epic verse such as Walafrid Strabo's 9th-century "De visionibus Wettini" (a predecessor of Dante's vernacular Divine Comedy), while Jesuits such as Jakob Masen (author of Sarcotis, a probable influence on Milton's Paradise Lost) also produced Latin epic verse as late as the 17th century. Summa Theologica, is the best-known work of Thomas Aquinas, was written in Latin. 

Jesuit poet Diego José Abad wrote the didactic, humanist religious poem De Deo heroica carmina (1769-1780), which was begun in Mexico and finished in Italy. It is written in Latin hexameter, in a strong style. It is divided into two parts, a Summa theologica and a life of Christ.

Notable writers
 Ambrose (Aurelius Ambrosius), archbishop of Milan and theologian
 Augustine of Hippo, author of Confessions and theology
 St Jerome, translator of the Bible into Latin
 Jacob Masen, German author of poetry, drama, history, and theology
 Prudentius, poet
 Walafrid Strabo, Frankish writer of poetry, theology, and history
 Tertullian, author of theological works
 John Scotus Eriugena
 Thomas Aquinas, he is known within the scholastic tradition 
 Marko Marulić, Croatian poet, Renaissance humanist, and Latin poet dubbed "The Christian Virgil".
Jacob Bidermann

References

External links
 

Latin-language literature
Christian literature